Toloella is a monotypic genus of Panamanian jumping spiders containing the single species, Toloella eximia. It was first described by Arthur Merton Chickering in 1946, and is found only in Panama.

References

Monotypic Salticidae genera
Salticidae
Spiders of Central America
Endemic fauna of Panama